The Smallest Show on Earth (US: Big Time Operators) is a 1957 British comedy film, directed by Basil Dearden, and starring Bill Travers, Virginia McKenna, Peter Sellers and Margaret Rutherford. The supporting cast includes Bernard Miles, Leslie Phillips, Francis de Wolff, George Cross, June Cunningham and Sid James. The screenplay was written by William Rose and John Eldridge from an original story by William Rose.

Plot
Matt and Jean (Travers and McKenna) are a young couple  with a longing to visit exotic places such as Samarkand. Matt inherits a cinema from his great uncle. When they look over their new property, they first mistake the modern Grand for it. They are soon disillusioned to learn that the cinema they actually own is the old decrepit Bijou Kinema (nicknamed "the flea pit"), which is sandwiched between two railway bridges. Along with the cinema come three long-time employees: Mrs. Fazackalee (Rutherford), the cashier and bookkeeper; Mr. Quill (Sellers), the projectionist; and Old Tom (Miles) the commissionaire, doorkeeper and usher.

Robin (Phillips), their solicitor, informs them that the Grand's owner, Mr. Hardcastle (De Wolff), had offered to buy the Bijou from Matt's great uncle for five thousand pounds in order to construct a car park for his nearby cinema. When they see their competitor however, he only offers them five hundred, thinking they have no choice but to accept.

Instead, on Robin's advice, they pretend to want to reopen the Bijou in order to force Hardcastle to raise his offer. At first, they seem to be succeeding, but then Old Tom inadvertently lets slip their overheard plan and Hardcastle refuses to budge. They decide to carry on with their bluff and go through with the opening. After a few mishaps, the business flourishes, especially after Matt employs the curvaceous Marlene Hogg (Cunningham) to sell ice creams and other treats at the interval.  To increase sales, the heat in the theater was turned up during the showing of a film where parched actors crawled across a desert.

Hardcastle counters by slipping a bottle of whisky into the next shipment of film reels for Quill, who has a drink problem. He eventually succumbs to the temptation, leaving Matt to try unsuccessfully to substitute for him; Matt is unable to work the antiquated projectors properly, and they are forced to refund the customers' money. Matt and Jean are ready to give up (with Old Tom eavesdropping again, this time hearing Matt say that he had often wished the Grand were burnt to the ground) only to wake up the next morning to find that the Grand has burned down (Old Tom was last seen carrying a can of fuel oil out of the door). Hardcastle is forced to pay ten thousand pounds for the Bijou in order to stay in business while his cinema is being rebuilt. As an added condition, he has to keep the three staff on as employees.

Just as Matt and Jean are leaving on the train, Old Tom tells Matt that "It were the only way, weren't it?", implying he committed arson. Alarmed, they decide to write him a letter asking him to clarify his remark, but instead send him a postcard... from Samarkand.

Cast
 Virginia McKenna as Jean Spenser 
 Bill Travers as Matt Spenser 
 Margaret Rutherford as Mrs. Fazackalee 
 Peter Sellers as Percy Quill 
 Bernard Miles as Old Tom 
 Francis de Wolff as Albert Hardcastle 
 Leslie Phillips as Robin Carter 
 June Cunningham as Marlene Hogg 
 Sid James as Mr. Hogg 
 George Cross as Commissionaire 
 George Cormack as Bell 
 Stringer Davis as Emmett 
 Michael Corcoran as Taxi Driver

Production
The Bijou Kinema was not a real building; both the exterior and interior were sets. The exterior facade was constructed between two railway bridges in Christchurch Avenue, London NW6, next to Kilburn tube station. A replica at Shepperton Studios was used for close-up shots and interior scenes.

The Gaumont Palace, Hammersmith in London (subsequently called the Hammersmith Odeon, and now the Hammersmith Apollo) was used for the exterior shots of the rival Grand Cinema with interiors at the Odeon in Richmond.

Back projection shots of Longton, Stoke-on-Trent, in Staffordshire were used for the final scenes in the railway carriage.

The silent film shown in the film is Comin' Thro the Rye (1923) starring Alma Taylor. Taylor is among the uncredited viewers in the audience.

Critical reception
The New York Times called it "a little package of nonsense ... populated by wonderfully wacky characters ... Margaret Rutherford's cashier, Peter Sellers' projectionist and Bernard Miles' doorman are gems"; Leonard Maltin called it a "Charming, often hilarious comedy"; and a modern review in the Radio Times wrote, "In praise of fleapits everywhere, this charming comedy will bring back happy memories for anyone who pines for the days when going to the pictures meant something more than being conveyor-belted in and out of a soulless multiplex...The cast alone makes the movie a must-see, and the sequence in which projectionist Peter Sellers, pianist Margaret Rutherford and doorman Bernard Miles relive the glories of the silent era is adorable."

References

External links
 
 
 

1957 films
1957 comedy films
British comedy films
British black-and-white films
Films directed by Basil Dearden
Films set in a movie theatre
Films scored by William Alwyn
1950s English-language films
1950s British films